St. Joseph's Chapel is a historic chapel located in Sacred Heart Cemetery in Eau Claire, Wisconsin. The chapel was used by the German Catholic congregation of Sacred Heart Parish. The Gothic Revival structure was built in 1896 by parishioner Joseph Bemish. It was added to the National Register of Historic Places in 1988 for its architectural significance.

History
Sacred Heart Parish, Eau Claire's German-speaking Catholic congregation, formed in 1875, when it split off from St. Patrick's Church. Parishioner Joseph Bemish built St. Joseph's Chapel in the church's cemetery in 1896; the chapel memorialized Joseph Boehm, the parish's pastor who had died three years earlier. Boehm, his successor John Metzler, and pastor Paul Geyer were buried in the chapel's basement, though their bodies were later moved to the cemetery. The chapel held occasional masses until 1943, after which it sat unused for several decades. In 1982, the congregation renovated the chapel and converted it to house maintenance equipment for the cemetery.

Architecture
The chapel is a one-room red brick structure with a Gothic Revival design. A tower rises above the church's front entrance; it features arched openings on each side and a cross at its peak. Arched stained glass windows flank the entrance and run along the sides of the building; a transom window above the entrance doorway matches the shape of these windows. A quatrefoil stained glass window is situated atop the arch of the transom. The chapel's interior features a carved wooden relief at the altar and a hand-painted ceiling.

References

Properties of religious function on the National Register of Historic Places in Wisconsin
Chapels in the United States
Buildings and structures in Eau Claire, Wisconsin
Gothic Revival church buildings in Wisconsin
Churches completed in 1896
National Register of Historic Places in Eau Claire County, Wisconsin